Miklós Maros (born 14 November 1943) is a Hungarian composer. He was born in Pécs, the son of composer Rudolf Maros and violinist Klára Molnár. He studied at the Béla Bartók Conservatory of Budapest with Rezsö Sugár and at the Ferenc Liszt Music Academy with Ferenc Szabó, and continued his studies in Stockholm with Ingvar Lidholm and György Ligeti.

From 1971 to 1973, Maros was composition teacher at the Stockholm Secondary School of Music. From 1971 to 1978, he taught at the Studio for Electronic Music (EMS) in Stockholm, and from 1976 to 1980 he taught at Stockholm Musikcollege. From 1980 to 1981, he was a guest of the Berlin Artists Program of the German Academic Exchange Service in West Berlin. In 1972 he and his wife, singer Ilona Maros, formed the Maros Ensemble for the performance of contemporary music. In 1990 Maros received the Lifetime-Artists’ Award of  the Swedish Government.

Works
In addition to two operas, he composed many works for chamber ensembles, symphonic works, concertos and vocal works. Selected compositions include:
Stage
Stora Grusharpan (The Large Gravel Harp), opera, 1982
Castrati - Neuter, opera, 2002

Orchestral
Concerto for Trombone and Orchestra, 1983
Symphony No. 4 for orchestra, 1998

Concertante
Sinfonia Concertante (Symphonie No. 3) for violin, cello, double bass and strings, 1986
Konzertmusik (Concert Music) for violin, viola and chamber ensemble, 1992

Chamber music
Violasonata for viola and live electronics, 1970
Glädjebud (Good Tidings) for trumpet, violin and viola, 1971
An Arty-and-crafty Lilt for alto, viola (or cello) and piano, 1976
Diptychon for viola and organ, 1979
Partite for viola and piano, 1991
Claris for clarinet, viola and piano, 1994
Confabulation for flute, viola and guitar, 1997

References

External links
List of works

1943 births
Franz Liszt Academy of Music alumni
Hungarian classical composers
Hungarian male classical composers
Hungarian music educators
Living people
Hungarian opera composers
Male opera composers